Anne Gøye (18 December 1609 – 9 January 1681) was a Danish noblewoman and a book collector. The daughter of Henrik Gøye of Skørringe (1562-1611) and Brigitte Brahe (1576-1619), she spent much of her childhood with her aunt Sophie Brahe and her husband Holger Rosenkrantz in Rosenholm Castle. In 1660, she set up her own home in Næstved but in 1673 moved to Odense where she lived in what is now known as Odense Adelige Jomfrukloster.

Gøye is remembered principally for her collection of Danish literature which she began to put together in Næstved, creating a library of some 900 printed books. On her death, she left the collection to her great niece Karen Brahe who subsequently expanded it. It is now housed in the Karen Brahe Library in Odense.

References

1609 births
1681 deaths
17th-century Danish people
17th-century Danish nobility
Danish book and manuscript collectors
Gøye family